Ryan Michelle Bathé (born July 27, 1976) is an American actress.

Early life
Bathe's mother is Clare Bathé, an actress and singer who was a member of the late 1970s funk/disco/rock group Machine. She grew up in Stamford, Connecticut. She graduated from Stanford University, and she received a Master of Fine Arts degree from New York University. She is a member of the sorority Delta Sigma Theta.

Career
Bathe has had guest starring roles in a number of television shows, including ER, Half & Half, Girlfriends, Brothers & Sisters, and How I Met Your Mother. She was regular cast member during the second season of the ABC legal drama series Boston Legal playing attorney Sara Holt. From  2009 to 2010, she had a recurring role on the short-lived NBC medical drama Trauma, and in 2011 had starring role in the TV Land sitcom Retired at 35. She had main roles in the independent films All About Us and April Moon.

In 2012, Bathe co-starred opposite Katherine Heigl in the crime comedy film One for the Money. Later that year, she had a recurring role opposite her real life husband Sterling K. Brown in the Lifetime drama series Army Wives. In 2014, she was a female lead opposite Kevin Hart in the ABC comedy pilot Keep It Together. In 2016, Bathe was cast in a recurring role in the NBC drama series, This Is Us, also starring Brown.

In 2018, Bathe was cast as one of leads in the BET+ comedy-drama series First Wives Club based on the film of the same name written by Robert Harling. In 2020, she signed a first look deal with ViacomCBS. In 2022, Bathe was cast as a lead alongside Morena Baccarin in the NBC heist thriller series The Endgame.

Personal life
In June 2007, Bathe married fellow actor and Stanford alum Sterling K. Brown. They have two sons.

Filmography

Film

Television

References

External links

 Ryan Michelle Bathe at TVLand.com

1976 births
Living people
Stanford University alumni
Tisch School of the Arts alumni
Actresses from St. Louis
Actresses from Stamford, Connecticut
21st-century American actresses
African-American actresses
American television actresses
American film actresses